Matthew King (born 25 June 1977) is an Australian cricketer. He played in one List A match for South Australia in 2001/02.

See also
 List of South Australian representative cricketers

References

External links
 

1977 births
Living people
Australian cricketers
South Australia cricketers
People from Port Pirie